Tachina zaqu is a species of fly in the genus Tachina of the family Tachinidae that is endemic to Qinghai, province of China.

References

Insects described in 1993
Diptera of Asia
Endemic fauna of China
zaqu